Ángel Edo Alsina (born 4 August 1970) is a Spanish former professional road racing cyclist, who competed from 1992 to 2007 as a professional. He competed in the individual road race at the 1992 Summer Olympics.

Major results

1991
1st Stage 1 Vuelta a Castilla y León
1992
1st Stage 1 Bayern Rundfahrt
1st Stage 7a Olympia's Tour
3rd Overall Vuelta a Castilla y León
1993
1st Stage 4 Vuelta a Castilla y León
3rd Clásica de Sabiñánigo
6th Trofeo Masferrer
1994
1st Trofeo Masferrer
1st Stage 2 Vuelta a Mallorca
1st Stage 1 Setmana Catalana de Ciclisme
 2nd Road race, National Road Championships
7th Overall Vuelta a Andalucía
1st Stage 1
1995
3rd Overall Vuelta a Mallorca
10th Overall Vuelta a Andalucía
1996
1st Stage 5 Giro d'Italia
3rd Circuito de Getxo
6th Clásica de Almería
1997
2nd Circuito de Getxo
9th Subida al Naranco
1998
1st Stage 2 Giro d'Italia
7th Clásica de Almería
1999
3rd Clásica de Almería
2000
Volta ao Algarve
1st Stages 1 & 3
Vuelta a Asturias
1st Stages 3 & 6
Volta a Portugal
1st Stages 3 & 4
1st Stage 3a Troféu Joaquim Agostinho
1st Stage 3 GP Sport Noticias
3rd Overall Volta ao Alentejo
1st Stage 5
3rd Road race, National Road Championships
2001
1st Stage 1 Setmana Catalana de Ciclisme
1st Stage 2 Volta a Portugal
1st Stage 1 GP Sport Noticias
2nd Overall Grande Prémio Jornal de Notícias
1st Stages 1, 2 & 5
7th Subida al Naranco
2002
Vuelta a Castilla y León
1st Stages 2 & 5
Volta a Portugal
1st Stages 2 & 12
Volta ao Alentejo
1st Stages 2 & 4
4th Clásica de Almería
7th Trofeo Luis Puig
10th Overall Vuelta a Murcia
1st Stage 4
2003
1st Stage 1 Volta ao Algarve
1st Stage 5 Vuelta a Asturias
1st Stage 10 Volta a Portugal
10th Clásica de Almería
2004
1st Stage 5 Setmana Catalana de Ciclisme
1st Stage 2 Troféu Joaquim Agostinho
7th GP Villafranca de Ordizia
2005
6th Trofeo Calvià
2006
1st Stage 1 Vuelta a Castilla y León
4th Circuito de Getxo

References

External links

1970 births
Living people
Spanish male cyclists
Olympic cyclists of Spain
Cyclists at the 1992 Summer Olympics
Spanish Giro d'Italia stage winners
People from Gavà
Sportspeople from the Province of Barcelona
Cyclists from Catalonia
20th-century Spanish people